The Museum of Contemporary Art Taipei (MoCA Taipei) is a museum of contemporary art, located in Datong District, Taipei, Taiwan.

History
The museum building was built during the Japanese rule in 1921 for what later became Jiànchéng Elementary School, which now occupies a new structure on the back of the historical building. After the handover of Taiwan from Japan to the Republic of China, it hosted the Taipei City Government and became an important landmark, thanks to its highly recognizable symmetrical building and belltower in historic style. After the city government had moved to the new location in Xinyi district, it was designated as a historical building, and re-opened on 27 May 2001 as Museum of Contemporary Art, Taipei (MOCA Taipei), as the first museum in Taiwan to be dedicated exclusively to contemporary art.

In 2021 MOCA director Loh Li-chen caused a scandal in the Taiwanese art world by making a xenophobic post on Facebook.

Exhibitions
While showcasing mainly contemporary Taiwanese art, under director Shih Jui-jen its activities have become increasingly international. In 2009, it organized a solo show of Taiwanese artist Yang Maolin as a pavilion at the Venice Biennale. In 2009 and 2010 it collaborated with MoCA Shanghai, Today Art Museum Beijing and Guangdong Museum of Art in the organization of the Animamix Biennial.

Hours of operation
The museum is open Tuesdays through Sundays from 10:00 a.m. to 6:00 p.m. It is closed on Mondays.

Transportation
The museum is accessible within walking distance South West from Zhongshan Station of the Taipei Metro.

See also
 List of museums in Taiwan

References

External links

 
 

2001 establishments in Taiwan
Art museums and galleries in Taiwan
Art museums established in 2001
Buildings and structures completed in 1921
Modern art museums
Contemporary Art Taipei